

Aaru, or the Field of Reeds, is the name for heavenly paradise in Egyptian mythology. It has been represented in hieroglyphs as three reeds: 𓇏.

Ancient Egyptians believed that the soul resided in the heart, and that each individual would therefore undergo a "Weighing of the Heart" in the afterlife; each human heart is weighed on a giant scale against an ostrich feather, which represents the concept of the goddess Maat. All souls that successfully balance the scales will be allowed to start a long and perilous journey to Aaru, where they will exist in peace and pleasure for eternity. Conversely, hearts that weigh heavy with evil will tip and fall into the crocodilian jaws of the goddess Ammit. Any souls that are subject to Ammit's "second death" are doomed to restlessness in the Duat.Qualifying souls undergo a long journey and face many perils before finally reaching Aaru. Once they arrive, they enter through a series of gates — the exact number of gates varies across sources, with given figures alternating between 15 gates and 21 gates. They are uniformly described as being guarded by deities and evil demons, and if the deceased passed through these final gates, they would be rowed across the water to the shores of the Field of Reeds.

Aaru was usually placed in the east, where the Sun rises, and has been described as comprising boundless reed fields, like those of the Nile Delta. Consequently, this ideal hunting and farming ground enabled qualified souls to live for eternity; more precisely, Aaru was envisaged as a series of islands covered in fields of reeds. The part where Osiris later dwelt is sometimes known as the "field of offerings".

Resident deities 
Aaru was also a residence for various deities worshiped by the deceased. Therefore the deceased live eternally in the presence and amongst the gods, ruled over by the resident god, Osiris. As a result, the deceased ate and drank the same delicacies devoured by their gods. Located outside of the gates of Aaru, where 21 deities guarding the gates to Aaru.

Deities of the Twenty-One Secret Portals Of The Mansion Of Osiris In The Field Of Reeds

See also
 Ancient Egyptian afterlife beliefs
 Elysium, heavenly afterlife location in Greek mythology
 Valhalla and Fólkvangr, heavenly afterlife locations in Norse mythology
 Ashihara no Nakatsukuni, heavenly afterlife location in Japanese mythology
 Nirvana, concept of rebirth liberation in the Indian religions
 Nirvana (Buddhism)
 Neorxnawang, old Anglo-Saxon term for "heavenly meadow" in the afterlife

In popular culture 

 Aaru makes an appearance in the episode "Asylum" of the Disney+ series Moon Knight (2022) where Taweret weighs the hearts of Marc Spector and his alter Steven Grant on the Scales of Justice to determine if they would be allowed to enter the Field of Reeds, which Marc manages to reach.
 In Assassin's Creed Origins, Aaru is an heavenly aspect of the game.

References

Citations

Bibliography

Jobes, Gertrude. Dictionary of Mythology, Folklore, and Stymbols, Part 1. New York:The Scarecrow Press, 1962.

Book of the Dead
Conceptions of heaven
Locations in Egyptian mythology
Osiris
Nile Delta